Katni Junction (Station Code: KTE) is a major rail junction in Katni, India. Rail links from the junction travel in five directions — Bina, Jabalpur, Satna, Bilaspur, Singrauli. Rail links from the junction travel to New Delhi, Mumbai, Vadodara, Howrah, Chennai, Bangalore, Allahabad, Kanpur, Lucknow, Bhopal, Indore, Gwalior, Agra, Gorakhpur, Muzaffarpur, Patna, Chandigarh, Ludhiana, Ambala, Bathinda, Jaipur, Jodhpur, Ajmer, Nagpur, Pune, Jammu, Raipur, Bhubaneswar, Visakhapatnam, Hyderabad, Hubli, Madurai, Vasco, Rameshvaram, Kanyakumari, Ernakulam and other Indian cities. To reduce the junction's load the new  & Katni South has been opened to carry trains from Bina and Jabalpur respectively.

Junction
Railway lines from five directions connect at the Katni railway station:
From the east (Renukut, Mugal Sarai, Howrah, Kolkata)
Katni–Singrauli–Howrah line via Singrauli that goes to West Bengal, Bihar, Jharkhand
Katni–Bilaspur line that goes further to Chhattisgarh, Odisha
From the north (Delhi, Kanpur)
Katni–Allahabad line that goes to Delhi, Uttarakhand, Uttar Pradesh
From the west (Mumbai, Ahmedabad)
Katni–Jabalpur–Itarsi line that goes west, south, southwest
Katni–Bina line that goes to Delhi, Uttarakhand, Uttar Pradesh, Rajasthan

Picture gallery

See also

References 

Jabalpur railway division
Railway junction stations in Madhya Pradesh
Railway stations in Katni district